John William Howard Thompson (1861-17 October 1959) was a British Liberal Party politician, solicitor and soldier.

Background
He was educated at Carshalton and Whitgift School, Croydon. He married Antoinette Ebden Keene of Crewkerne, Somerset. They had two daughters. His wife died in 1940. His daughter Antoinette Winifred Thompson married the 6th Marquess Conyngham.

Career
He worked as a solicitor. He was Liberal MP for Somerset East from 1906 to 1910. He gained the seat at the 1906 General Election from the Liberal Unionists. 

He served just one parliamentary term before losing his seat back to the Liberal Unionists at the General Election in January 1910. 

He stood again at the General Election of December 1910 but was unable to regain his seat. 

He was a captain in the Devonshire 11th Service battalion in 1915 and a major in the 24th (County of London) Battalion (The Queen's) in 1916. He did not contest the 1918 General election. He did however contested the 1920 Ilford by-election, where he finished third; 

 

He remained at Ilford to contest the seat at the 1922 General Election, when he came second, pushing Labour into third place. 

He did not contest the following three General Elections but remained a supporter of the Liberal Party. His return to the electoral fight came at the 1931 General Election, when he returned to Somerset and fought the Conservative seat of Wells. Much of the Wells constituency was part of the Somerset East constituency that he had represented before the First World War. He came second with a credible vote share;
 

He did not stand for parliament again.

Sources
Who Was Who
British parliamentary election results 1885–1918, Craig, F. W. S.

References

External links 
Thompson newsreel footage from 1920 Pathe
Who Was Who; http://www.ukwhoswho.com

1861 births
1959 deaths
Liberal Party (UK) MPs for English constituencies
UK MPs 1906–1910